Neerody is a village located at the southernmost coastal tip of the Tamil Nadu state of India. It is bordered by the Arabian Sea, and the A.V.M. Canal. A road cuts the village into two. The principal language spoken in Neerody is Tamil & Malayalam.

Historical background
Historically, Neerody formed a part of the Travancore princely state. In 1956 the States Reorganisation Act of 1 November, Neerody was incorporated into the Tamil speaking state of Tamil Nadu.

Neerody is mostly Christian. Christianity in Neerody probably dates from the arrival of Portuguese missionaries in India, but may have been introduced earlier. Additionally, due to pioneer missionary St. Francis Xavier, Christianity spread far and wide in southern India so that by the close of the sixteenth century, Christian communities were well-established all along the Indian coast.

Now Neerody is part of Kollemcode Municipality.

Economy
Approximately, 95% of the population of Neerody is involved in the fishing trade. The remaining 5% are of the educated or salaried class. However, the entire community depends on the sea.

Neerody fishermen are known for their migratory fishing patterns. These fishermen are experts of seasonal fishing and often travel hundreds of miles in search of fish stocks. During the Ani-Adi season (between June and August), they flock to the sea port of Vizhinjam. During other seasons, they travel to the post cities of Mangalapuram, Pallikara, Neendakara, Katpadi, Kaapu, and Ejamadi. Though the fishermen of Neerody are skillful, nearly all the families are of lower class income.

Education

 Neerody has one St.Nicholas High School and 7 Nursery schools. 

 100% results on the 10th SSLC Examination. However, 5% of the students never complete the equivalent of the eighth grade.

Festivals
The St. Nicholas Festival will be held from November 27 to December 06

Villages in Kanyakumari district